Goksuv (Göksuv-otar) is a rural locality (a selo) in Temiraulsky Selsoviet, Khasavyurtovsky District, Republic of Dagestan, Russia. The population was 749 as of 2010. There are 11 streets.

Geography 
Goksuv is located 27 km east of Khasavyurt (the district's administrative centre) by road. Novy Sulak is the nearest rural locality.

References 

Rural localities in Khasavyurtovsky District